On a Magical Night is a 2019 comedy film written and directed by Christophe Honoré and starring Chiara Mastroianni. It was screened in the Un Certain Regard section at the 2019 Cannes Film Festival, where Mastroianni won the award for Best Performance.

Plot
College lecturer Maria has been married to Richard for twenty years. After revealing her history of affairs with other men, she leaves the Paris apartment and spends the night in a hotel across the street. She is visited by her ex-lovers, as well as Richard's younger self.

Cast
 Chiara Mastroianni as Maria Mortemart
 Vincent Lacoste as Richard Warrimer at 20 years old
 Benjamin Biolay as Richard Warrimer at 40 years old
 Camille Cottin as Irène Haffner at 40 years old
 Carole Bouquet as Irène Haffner at 60 years old
 Marie-Christine Adam as Maria's mother

Production
The film's working title was Musique de chambre. Christophe Honoré wrote the screenplay of the film for Chiara Mastroianni, imagining her as "a Cary Grant-type character." It is Honoré's first film that was shot in a studio. It was shot in six weeks, five of which were in the studio. Filming wrapped on 19 March 2019.

Release
The film had its premiere in the Un Certain Regard section at the 2019 Cannes Film Festival on 19 May 2019. It was released in France on 9 October 2019. It was released as video on demand via virtual cinema on 8 May 2020.

Reception

Box office
On a Magical Night grossed $0 in the United States and Canada and $2.9 million in other territories.

Critical response
The website's critical consensus reads, "It isn't quite as exceptional as the titular evening, but On a Magical Night offers enough Gallic whimsy to satisfy audiences in the mood for some romance." On Metacritic, the film has a weighted average score of 53 out of 100, based on 12 critics, indicating "mixed or average reviews".

Stephen Dalton of The Hollywood Reporter called the film "Breezy and bright, with the stylized look and feel of a stage play". Owen Gleiberman of Variety wrote, "At 90 minutes, the film feels endless, and we have too much time to notice that the two actors playing Richard seem like two totally different people, and that the film has holes in its fantasy logic you could drive a truck through."

Chiara Mastroianni won the Best Performance award in the Un Certain Regard section at the 2019 Cannes Film Festival.

References

External links
 
 

2019 films
2019 comedy films
Belgian comedy films
Films directed by Christophe Honoré
Films set in hotels
Films set in Paris
Films shot in Luxembourg
Films shot in Paris
French comedy films
2010s French-language films
Luxembourgian comedy films
French-language Belgian films
2010s French films